Kerem Catay (born 1979) is the CEO of Ay Yapım, producer of various TV series and Turkey's leading production company for drama series, formats, weekly and daily shows. Born in Ankara, Kerem Çatay graduated from Bilkent University Faculty of Economics, Administrative and Social Sciences. He completed his education in the Film and Television program at UCLA.

He is known as the producer of countless phenomenally successful TV series, from 2008's ground-breaking Aşk-ı Memnu (Forbidden Love) to 2009's Ezel. Çatay's productions are renowned for their well-crafted, captivating stories based on both original screenplays and literary adaptations. Nearly all of Çatay's productions have been sold at least 41 countries, MENA to Sweden, Eastern & Southern Asia, Eastern Europe, the Balkans plus some of the African TV channels. They are also made available via the Internet worldwide.

Television series

References

External links 
 

Bilkent University alumni
Living people
Turkish television producers
Turkish chief executives
UCLA Film School alumni
People from Ankara
1979 births